Ryan Tromp (born October 5, 1973) is an Aruban football player. He has played for Aruba national team.

National team statistics

References

1973 births
Living people
Aruban footballers
Association football goalkeepers
SV Jong Aruba players
Aruba international footballers